Dinica is a genus of moths belonging to the family Tineidae.

Species
Listed in alphabetical order:
Dinica aspirans Meyrick, 1920 - found from Kenya
Dinica diana Gozmány, 1966 - Uganda
Dinica dierli Petersen, 1983 - Nepal
Dinica endochrysa Meyrick, 1935 - Japan
Dinica hyacinthopa Meyrick, 1932 - Uganda
Dinica orphnospila Meyrick, 1934 - Uganda
Dinica rhombata Huang, Wang & Hirowatari, 2006 - China (Guangdong, Hunan, Zhejiang)
Dinica rotunda Li & Xiao, 2007 - China (Tibet)
Dinica ruiliensis Li & Xiao, 2007  - China (Yunnan), Thailand
Dinica sulciformis Li & Xiao, 2007 - China (Guizhou, Sichuan)
Dinica uncata Li & Xiao, 2007  - China (Gansu)
Dinica vulcanica Gozmány, 2004 - Namibia

References

Nemapogoninae
Tineidae genera